Daniel Frank McCoy (born January 24, 1994) is an ice sled hockey player from the US and former member of the U.S. National Sled Hockey Team.  Dan took part in the 2014 Winter Paralympics in Sochi, where USA won the gold medal. The US defeated Russia 1–0 in the final. McCoy retired from international competition in 2018 but continues to play within North America on the Pittsburgh Mighty Penguins Sled Hockey Senior team where is a player/coach. See penguinssledhockey.org.

McCoy was born in Pittsburgh, Pennsylvania. Born with spina bifida, McCoy has been an inspiration for perseverance and determination as he continues to challenge himself to rise above his disability.

Biographical Information 
Daniel Frank McCoy was born at Allegheny General Hospital in Pittsburgh to Mark and Angela (née Piluso) McCoy.  McCoy was born with myelomeningocele (Spina Bifida) at lumbar area 3-4 which has resulted in partial paralysis. His older brother, Andrew, is a Fellow in Pediatrics Rehabilitation at the University of Colorado's Children's Hospital.

At the age of 5, McCoy was introduced to the sport of sled hockey by volunteers from Shriners Hospital in Erie, PA who traveled to Pittsburgh twice a month to provide sports therapy for individuals with physical disabilities in the area.  At the time, McCoy's three-year-older brother Andrew was beginning to play stand-up hockey.  McCoy knew that physically he could not play hockey like his brother but found that sled hockey, where players sit in sleds and propel themselves using two mini hockey sticks equipped with picks on one end, was as challenging. McCoy is one of the original players in the Mighty Penguins Sled Hockey organization and still competes with the senior team as captain.

At the age of 8, McCoy watched the 2002 Salt Lake City Paralympic Games in which a fellow Mighty Penguins player, Josh Wirt, was a member of the U.S. National Sled Hockey Team.  Seeing Team U.S.A win gold inspired a dream in McCoy to one day compete for the U.S. at the Paralympics.

At the age of 14, McCoy was selected for the U.S. Development Sled Hockey Team (Junior Sled Hockey team).  At the age of 16, he was selected for the U.S. National Sled Hockey team.  His dream of competing for his country came true when he traveled to Sochi in 2014 and competed in the Paralympic's sledge hockey games bringing home gold.

McCoy is an ACE certified personal trainer and is certified in CPR/AED.  His passion is helping those with or without disabilities improve their physical well-being but setting and meeting fitness goals.  More information can be found at www.danmccoyfitness.com.

In addition to playing sled hockey, McCoy enjoys handcycling and has competed in several Pittsburgh Marathons.

Sled Hockey Career Highlights 

Source:

Summary
 Gold medalist at the 2014 Paralympic Winter Games in Sochi, Russia.
 As a member of the U.S. National Sled Hockey Team, has played in three International Paralympic Committee Sled Hockey World Championships (gold – 2012, 2015; silver – 2013) and seven World Sled Hockey Challenge tournaments (first – 2012, 2015, 2016; second – 2011 (Nov.), 2013; third – 2011 (Apr.))
 Helped Team USA to a first-place finish at the January 2013 USA Hockey Sled Cup in Indian Trail, North Carolina. Scored twice in the championship game win vs. Korea
 Helped Team USA to a third-place finish at the March 2011 Japan Para Ice Sled Hockey Championship in Nagano, Japan. Tallied one assist in three games
 Two-time U.S. National Developmental Sled Hockey Team member (2009–10)
Paralympic Winter Games
 2014: Tallied two assists over five games
IPC Sled Hockey World Championship
 2015: Collected two points (1-1) in four games. Scored a goal in the gold-medal victory over Canada.
 2013: Recorded one assist over four games
 2012: Notched one goal in five games
World Sled Hockey Challenge
 2016: Notched a goal and an assist in five games. Named U.S. Player of the Game in the 6–2 victory over Russia.
 2015: Tallied six points (2-4) in five games
 2013: Skated in all five games
 2012: Scored twice in five games
 2011 (Nov.): Scored twice in five games
 2011 (Apr.): Posted four points (3-1) in five games

References

External links 
 
 

1994 births
Living people
American sledge hockey players
Paralympic sledge hockey players of the United States
Paralympic gold medalists for the United States
Ice sledge hockey players at the 2014 Winter Paralympics
Medalists at the 2014 Winter Paralympics
People with spina bifida
Ice hockey people from Pittsburgh
Paralympic medalists in sledge hockey